The Quercy Phosphorites Formation (French: Phosphorites du Quercy) is a geologic formation and Lagerstätte in Occitanie, southern France. It preserves fossils dating back to the Paleogene period (latest Bartonian to Late Oligocene), or MP16 to MP28 zones of the European land mammal age classification, ranging from approximately 38 to 25 Ma.

It qualifies as a Lagerstätte because beside a large variety of mammals, birds, turtles, crocodiles, flora and insects, it also preserves the soft tissues of amphibians and squamates, in addition to their articulated skeleton in what has been called natural mummies.

The genera Quercylurus, Quercymegapodius, Quercypsitta, Quercypodargus, Quercycerta and Quercygama, and species Mosaicomeryx quercyi, Robiacina quercyi, Palaeophyllophora quercyi, Archaeomys quercyi, Eomys quercyi, Eucricetodon quercyi and Tarnomys quercynus, as well as the lizards Paraplacosauriops quercyi and Pseudolacerta quercyini and the insect Palaeortona quercyensis were named after the formation.

Description 
The first phosphate deposits in Quercy were discovered in 1869 and published by Daubré and Trutat independently in 1871. The first fossils from the formation were described by Delfortie (1872) and Gervais in the same year and extensively studied by Filhol from 1877 onwards. The first geologic investigation of the formation was performed by Thévenin in 1903, and apart from a description by Gèze in 1938, the paleontological richness was not studied until a team of researchers of the Universities of Montpellier and Paris visited the site in 1965.

The karstified phosphate deposits are found from the Lot and Célé river valleys in the north to the left bank of the Aveyron in the south and from the Villefranche Fault in the east to the lacustrine deposits of the Aquitaine Basin in the west. The formation is found in fissures (karst) incising Jurassic and Triassic rocks east of Cahors. The age of the fossiliferous unit, in which almost 12,000 specimens were found ranges from the MP16 to MP28 zones of the European land mammal age classification. These ages correspond to the latest Bartonian to Chattian, from about 38 to 25 Ma.

Paleontological significance 

The Quercy Phosphorites Formation is a highly fossiliferous unit designated as a Lagerstätte due to the excellent preservation of fossils. The phosphorite conserves up to the nerves, digestive tract and stomach content, insect larvae and other elements of the paleobiology in the formation. Nearly all Quercy fly pupae were preserved as isolated endocasts, of which many were still covered by the puparium, the hardened skin of the last larval instar. The formation also straddles the Grande Coupure and shows diversity changes (number of species) of frog, salamander, lizard and snake fossil records across the formation. It is assumed that the Quercy arthropods fossilized by a rapid fixation by phosphate-rich water followed by encrustation and mineralization.

Fossil content 
The following fossils have been reported from the formation:

Mammals 
Primates
 Cryptadapis tertius

Apatotheria

 Heterohyus (Chardinyus) nanus
 Heterohyus (Gervaisyus) pygmaeus
 Chardinyus sp.
 Gervaisyus sp.

Artiodactyls

 Bachitherium guirounetensis
 B. lavocati
 Cryptomeryx gaudryi
 Dichobune sigei
 Dichodon vidalenci
 Iberomeryx matsoui
 Mosaicomeryx quercyi
 Paroxacron bergeri
 Plesiomeryx cadurcensis
 Prodremotherium elongatum
 Pseudamphimeryx salesmei
 Robiacina lavergnensis
 R. quercyi
 Tapirulus perrierensis

Carnivora

 Amphicynodon typicus
 Cynodyctis lacustris neboulensis
 Dinailurictis bonali
 Eofelis edwardsii
 E. giganteus
 Eusmilus bidentatus
 Mustelictis cf. major
 M. aff. olivieri
 Nimravus intermedius
 Pachycynodon amphictina
 P. crassirostris
 P. cf. dubius
 P. cf. filholi
 Palaeogale sectoria
 Peignictis pseudamphictis
 Quercylurus major
 Wangictis tedfordi
 Cephalogale sp.
 cf. Eofelis sp.

Chiroptera

 Hipposideros (Pseudorhinolophus) sehlosseri
 H. (P.) trassounius
 H. (P.) zbrjdi
 Leuconoe lavocati
 Palaeophyllophora oltina
 P. quercyi
 Stehlinia bonisi
 S. minor
 Vaylatsia garouillasensis
 Vespertiliavus gerscheli
 V. gracilis
 V. lapradensis

Creodonta
 Paracynohyaenodon magnus
 Parapterodon lostangensis

Euarchonta
 Darbonetus aubrelongensis

Hyaenodonta
 Paroxyaena pavlovi

Lipotyphla

 Amphidozotherium cayluxi
 Darbonetus aubrelongensis
 D. tuberi
 Myxomygale antiqua
 Saturninia beata
 S. pelissiei

Marsupials

 Amphiperatherium bourdellense
 A. lamandini
 Peratherium bretouense
 P. cayluxi
 P. lavergnense
 P. perrierense

Perissodactyls
 Pachynolophus bretovense

Proeutheria
 Pseudorhyncocyon cayluxi

Rodents

 Archaeomys intermedius
 A. quercyi
 Bernardia marandati
 Blainvillimys gemellus
 B. gousnatensis
 B. langei
 B. rotundidens
 Elfomys medius
 Eomys gigas
 E. minus
 E. quercyi
 Eucricetodon atavus
 E. quercyi
 Gliravus garouillensis
 G. itardiensis
 Issiodoromys limognensis
 I. pauffiensis
 Palaeosciurus goti
 Paradelomys spelaeus
 Patriotheridcmys altus
 P. altus neboulensis
 P. sudrei
 Pseudoltinomys gaillardi
 P. major
 P. phosphoricus
 Sciuromys cayluxi
 S. rigali
 Tarnomys quercynus
 Theridomys ludensis

Birds 

 Horusornis vianeyliaudae
 Idiornis itardiensis
 Itardiornis hessae
 Necrobyas minimus
 Palaeoglaux perrierensis
 Palaeotodus escampsiensis
 P. itardiensis
 Paleseyvus escampensis
 Primocolius sigei
 P. minor
 Quercymegapodius brodkorbi
 Quercypsitta ivani
 Q. sudrei
 Recurvirostra sanctaeneboulae
 Sylphornis bretouensis
 Ventivorus ragei
 Ameghinornis sp.
 Leptoganga sp.
 Nocturnavis sp.

Reptiles 
Caprimulgiformes
 Euronyctibius kurochkini
 Quercypodargus olsoni

Crocodiles
 Alligator gaudryi

Lizards

 Ayalasaurus tenuis
 Brevisaurus smithi
 Cadurciguana hoffstetteri
 Cadurcogekko piveteaui
 Dracaenosaurus croizeti
 Eurheloderma gallicum
 Geiseltaliellus lamandini
 Mediolacerta roceki
 Necrosaurus cayluxi
 N. eucarinatus
 Omoiotyphlops priscus
 Paraplacosauriops quercyi
 Placosaurus rugosus
 Plesiolacerta lydekkeri
 Pseudeumeces cadurcensis
 Pseudolacerta mucronata
 P. quercyini
 Quercycerta maxima
 Quercygama galliae
 Uromastyx europaeus
 Placosaurus sp.

Snakes

 Cadurcoboa insolita
 Coluber cadurci
 Dunnophis cadurcensis
 Eoanilius europae
 Natrix mlynarskii
 Palaeopython cadurcensis
 P. filholi
 P. neglectus
 Paleryx cayluxi
 Platyspondylia lepta
 Plesiotortrix edwardsi

Turtles

 Ptychogaster cayluxensis
 Testudo phosphoritarum
 Testudinidae indet.

Amphibians 
Frogs

 Bufo serratus
 T. gezei
 Thaumastosaurus bottii

Salamanders

 Heteroclitotriton zitteli
 Megalotriton filholi
 M. portisi
 Phosphotriton sigei

Insects 

 Coptera anka
 Onthophilus intermedius
 Palaeortona quercyensis
 Xenomorphia handschini
 X. resurrecta
 Blattodea
 Coleoptera
 Diptera
 Ensifera
 Hymenoptera
 Lepidoptera
 Myriapoda

Flora 

 Palmocaulon sp.
 Anacardiaceae indet.
 Caryophyllales indet.
 Malvaceae indet.
 Menispermacae indet.
 Sapotaceae indet.
 Ulmaceae indet.
 Vitaceae indet.

References

Bibliography 

Map reports
 

Paleontology

Further reading

External links 

 
Geologic formations of France
Eocene Series of Europe
Oligocene Series of Europe
Paleogene France
Phosphorite formations
Fossiliferous stratigraphic units of Europe
Paleontology in France
Formations